Aaron James Judge (born April 26, 1992) is an American professional baseball outfielder for the New York Yankees of Major League Baseball (MLB). Judge was unanimously selected as the American League (AL) Rookie of the Year in 2017, and finished second in voting for the AL Most Valuable Player Award that year. In 2022, he set the AL record for most home runs in a season with 62, breaking the 61-year-old record held by Roger Maris, and winning the AL Most Valuable Player Award.

Judge played college baseball for the Fresno State Bulldogs, and the Yankees selected him with the 32nd pick in the first round of the 2013 MLB draft. After making his MLB debut in 2016 and hitting a home run in his first major league at bat, Judge went on to have a record-breaking rookie season. In 2017, he was named an All-Star, won the Home Run Derby (the first MLB rookie to do so), and hit 52 home runs, breaking Mark McGwire's MLB rookie record of 49 and Joe DiMaggio's Yankee full-season rookie record of 29. His rookie record stood for two years, until Pete Alonso hit 53 home runs in 2019. Judge won the AL Rookie of the Month Awards for April, May, June, and September, as well as the AL's Player of the Month Award for June and September. After the 2022 season,  he re-signed with the Yankees on a nine-year, $360 million contract and was subsequently named the team's captain.

Early life
Judge was born in Sacramento, California, and he was adopted the day after he was born by Patty and Wayne Judge, who both worked as teachers in Linden, California. When he was 10 or 11 years old, his parents told him that he was adopted; he recalls, "I knew I didn't look like them." He has an older brother, John, who was also adopted. Judge is biracial. Growing up, Judge was a San Francisco Giants fan.

He played as a pitcher and first baseman for the baseball team, a wide receiver for the football team, and as a center for the basketball team. He set a school record for touchdowns (17) in football and led the basketball team in points per game (18.2). In baseball, he was part of the Linden High School team that made the California Interscholastic Federation Division III playoffs. Judge graduated from Linden High in 2010.

College career
Various colleges recruited Judge to play tight end in football, including Notre Dame, Stanford, and UCLA, but he preferred baseball. The Oakland Athletics selected him in the 31st round of the 2010 MLB draft, but he opted to enroll at California State University, Fresno (Fresno State) to play for the Fresno State Bulldogs baseball team in the Western Athletic Conference (WAC). In 2011, Judge was part of a Fresno State team that shared the Western Athletic Conference (WAC) regular season title, won the WAC Tournament, and qualified for the 2011 NCAA Division I baseball tournament. Louisville Slugger named him a Freshman All-American. He won the 2012 TD Ameritrade College Home Run Derby. He played collegiate summer baseball for the Brewster Whitecaps of the Cape Cod Baseball League in the summer of 2012. In his junior year, Judge led the Bulldogs in home runs, doubles, and runs batted in (RBIs). Judge was named to the all-conference team in all three of his seasons for the Bulldogs—in the WAC in his first two seasons, and the Mountain West Conference (MW) as a junior (the Bulldogs joined the MW in July 2012, between his sophomore and junior seasons).

Professional career

Draft and minor leagues

The Yankees drafted Judge in the first round of the 2013 MLB draft with the 32nd overall selection, a pick the team received as compensation after losing Nick Swisher in free agency. Judge signed with the Yankees and received a $1.8 million signing bonus. He tore a quadriceps femoris muscle while participating in a base running drill, which kept him out of the 2013 season.

He made his professional debut with the Charleston RiverDogs of the Class A South Atlantic League in 2014. He had a .333 batting average (6th in the league), .428 on-base percentage (OBP; 3rd), .530 slugging percentage (SLG; 6th), a .958 OPS and hit nine home runs with 45 RBIs in 65 games for Charleston. The Yankees promoted him to the Tampa Yankees of the Class A-Advanced Florida State League during the season, where he hit .283 with a .411 OBP (2nd in the league), .442 SLG, eight home runs, and 33 RBIs in 66 games for Tampa.

The Yankees invited Judge to spring training as a non-roster player in 2015. Judge began the 2015 season with the Trenton Thunder of the Class AA Eastern League. After Judge batted .284/.350/.510 (5th in the league) with 12 home runs (tied for 9th) in 63 games for Trenton, the Yankees promoted Judge to the Scranton/Wilkes-Barre RailRiders of the Class AAA International League in June. He was chosen to represent the Yankees at the 2015 All-Star Futures Game. The Yankees decided not to include Judge in their September call-ups. Judge batted .224/.308/.373 with eight home runs in 61 games for Scranton/Wilkes-Barre. The Yankees invited Judge to spring training in 2016, and he began the season with Scranton/Wilkes-Barre. Judge was named to the International League All-Star Team in 2016, but did not play in the 2016 Triple-A All-Star Game after he spent a month on the disabled list due to a knee sprain. In 93 games for the RailRiders, Judge batted .270/.366/.489 with 19 home runs (4th in the league), 62 runs (tied for 8th), and 65 RBIs (tied for 7th).

New York Yankees (2016–present)

2016

Judge made his MLB debut on August 13, 2016, starting in right field against the Tampa Bay Rays. In his first MLB at-bat, Judge hit a home run off Matt Andriese; the previous batter, Tyler Austin, also making his MLB debut, had done the same. This marked the first time that two teammates had hit home runs in their first MLB career at bats in the same game. Judge also hit a home run in his second MLB game, becoming the second Yankees player (after Joe Lefebvre in 1980) to homer in each of his first two MLB games. Judge's debut season, in which he batted .179/.263/.345 and struck out 42 times in 84 at-bats (95 plate appearances), ended prematurely when he was placed on the 15-day disabled list with a grade two right oblique strain on September 13, 2016, against the Los Angeles Dodgers.

2017
The Yankees named Judge their Opening Day right fielder against the Tampa Bay Rays. He had his first multi-home run game on April 28 against the Baltimore Orioles to help the Yankees win 14–11, coming back from a 9–1 deficit. Judge ended the month of April with 10 home runs, tying the rookie record set by José Abreu and Trevor Story. He was named the American League's (AL) Rookie of the Month for April. In April, he had a .303 batting average, 10 home runs, 20 RBIs, and a .411 OBP in 22 games.

The Yankees debuted a cheering section in the right-field seats of Yankee Stadium on May 22, 2017. Called "The Judge's Chambers", the section spans three rows in section 104 and contains 18 seats. Fans are chosen by the team to sit there and are outfitted with black robes, wigs, and foam gavels. In a game against the Oakland Athletics on May 28, Judge hit his first career grand slam. Judge was named AL Rookie of the Month once again for May. In May, he had a .347 batting average, seven home runs, 17 RBIs, and a .441 OBP in 26 games.

The following day, Judge went 4-for-4 with two home runs; one of the home runs traveled , making it the longest home run hit in the 2017 season. On June 12, Judge was named the AL Player of the Week. His week ended with him leading the AL in all three Triple Crown categories. Judge was named the AL Player of the Month for the month of June, batting .337 with 10 home runs, 25 RBIs and a .481 OBP. His performance in the month of June also earned him his third consecutive AL Rookie of the Month award, the longest streak since Mike Trout won four in a row in 2012. Judge had a 32-game on-base streak, including reaching base in every game in the month of June. On July 2, Judge was voted as a starting outfielder to the 2017 MLB All-Star Game, receiving 4,488,702 votes, the most of any player in the AL.

Judge broke Joe DiMaggio's record for most home runs hit by a Yankees rookie with his 30th on July 7. He became the second rookie to hit 30 home runs before the All-Star break (the first was Mark McGwire in 1987) and the first Yankee to do so since Alex Rodriguez in 2007. Before the All-Star break, Judge hit .329 with 30 home runs and 66 RBIs.

Judge won the 2017 Home Run Derby, besting Minnesota Twins third baseman Miguel Sanó 11–10 in the final round to become the first rookie to win the Derby outright. After his performance, MLB commissioner Rob Manfred stated that Judge is a player "who can become the face of the game". On July 21, Judge hit a home run that almost travelled out of Safeco Field. The ball was hit so hard that Statcast could not measure the details on the home run.

On August 16, Judge hit a  home run at Citi Field that reached the third deck; he also broke a record for position players by striking out in a 33rd consecutive game. On August 20, Judge tied pitcher Bill Stoneman's streak of striking out in 37 consecutive games.

On September 4, Judge became the first AL rookie to record 100 walks in a single season since Al Rosen (1950), and the first player in MLB to do it since Jim Gilliam (1953). During a game on September 10, Judge received his 107th walk, the most walks by a rookie in a season since Ted Williams in 1939. During the same game, he also became the second rookie in MLB history to hit 40 home runs in a season since McGwire (1987). He joined Babe Ruth (1920), Lou Gehrig (1927), Joe DiMaggio (1937) and Mickey Mantle (1956) as the only Yankees to hit 40 home runs in a season at age 25 or younger.

On September 25, Judge hit his 49th and 50th home runs, tying and surpassing Mark McGwire's single season rookie home run record. On September 30, Judge hit his 52nd home run of the season and his 33rd at Yankee Stadium, surpassing Babe Ruth's single-season record (set in 1921) for most home runs hit by a Yankees player at his home ballpark. After the conclusion of September, Judge won Player of the Month for the second time and Rookie of the Month for the fourth time.

Judge finished the 2017 season with a .284 batting average, 52 home runs, and 114 RBIs. He led the American League in home runs, runs scored (128), and walks (a major-league rookie record 127). He ranked second in the league in RBIs. He also struck out an MLB-leading 208 times, breaking the Yankees record previously set by Curtis Granderson in 2012 and a rookie record previously set by Kris Bryant in 2015.

With the Yankees finishing the year with a 91–71 record, the team clinched a wild card in the 2017 MLB postseason. During the Wild Card Game against the Minnesota Twins, Judge hit a home run en route to an 8–4 Yankees victory. In Game 3 of the 2017 American League Division Series (ALDS), Judge robbed Francisco Lindor of a home run, preserving the tie game. Judge struck out 16 times in the series, setting an ALDS record. After the Yankees defeated the Cleveland Indians in the ALDS, Judge hit three home runs for the Yankees in the 2017 American League Championship Series (ALCS). He also robbed Yulieski Gurriel of a potential home run in the Yankees' Game 7 ALCS loss to the Houston Astros. He finished with 27 strikeouts in the postseason, a major league record

End-of-season awards for Judge included selection as an outfielder on Baseball America'''s All-MLB Team, the Players Choice Award for Outstanding AL Rookie, and a Silver Slugger Award. Judge was unanimously voted as the American League Rookie of the Year. He went on to finish second in the voting for the 2017 American League Most Valuable Player Award to José Altuve, receiving two first-place votes, 27 second-place votes and one third-place vote.

On November 21, it was revealed that Judge had undergone arthroscopic surgery in his left shoulder for a cartilage cleanup, an injury dating back to April of that year.

2018

On March 31, Judge made his first career start at center field in the majors.

Batting .277 with 25 home runs and 58 RBIs, Judge was named a starting outfielder for the 2018 Major League Baseball All-Star Game.

On July 26, Judge was hit by a 93 MPH fastball by Kansas City Royals pitcher Jakob Junis on his right wrist and left the game in the fourth inning. Later, an MRI/CT scan revealed that he suffered a fractured ulnar styloid bone in his wrist. No surgery was required, and initial reports gave a three-week timetable for Judge to recover. The injury took longer to heal than expected, with Judge missing close to two months as a result. On September 18, Judge returned to the starting lineup against the Boston Red Sox. Judge finished the season with a .278 batting average, 27 home runs, and 67 RBIs in 112 games. The Yankees beat the Oakland A's in the Wild Card Game, but were defeated, three games to one, by the Red Sox in the American League Division Series.

2019

Judge started the season off with a .288 batting average, five home runs, and 11 RBIs in 20 games played . However, on April 20, Judge suffered a left oblique strain while hitting a single in the sixth inning against the Kansas City Royals. He did not play again until his return on June 21.

On August 27, Judge hit his 17th home run of the season and 100th home run of his career, a 462-foot blast against the Seattle Mariners. Coming in his 371st game, it made him the third-fastest MLB player to hit 100 home runs.

Judge hit a home run over the Green Monster for the first time on September 8. With this home run, the 2019 Yankees set a new franchise record for most home runs in a single season as a team.

In 2019, he batted .272/.381/.540, with 27 home runs and 55 RBIs in 378 at-bats. Balls he hit had the highest exit velocity on average of those hit by all major leaguers, at 95.9 mph. He led the league in defensive runs saved as a right fielder (19 runs saved, tied with Cody Bellinger, but given higher placing due to efficiency by playing in fewer innings (775.1 vs. 911.1)). This earned him the Wilson Defensive Player of the Year Award for his position in right field.

2020
During Spring Training, Judge was dealing with soreness in his pectoral area. It was eventually revealed that he had suffered a stress fracture in his ribs and was ruled out for at least two weeks.

Judge began the COVID-19 pandemic-delayed 60-game regular season with five consecutive games with a home run (6 during the span), launching a 419-feet, 108 MPH three-run shot off of Boston Red Sox pitcher Matt Hall. His streak ended on August 3 when he went 2-for-4 without a home run. It was the longest by a Yankees player since Alex Rodriguez (September 4–9, 2007). On August 14, Judge was placed on the 10-day injured list with a right calf strain. On August 26, he was again placed on the 10-day injured list after straining the same calf the day he returned against the Atlanta Braves. He finished the season slashing .257/.336/.554 with nine home runs and 22 RBI over 28 games.

2021
During the week of May 10–17, Judge earned his fourth career AL Player of the Week Award, most recently winning in September 2017. He was the second Yankees winner this season, following his teammate Corey Kluber who earned Player of the Month honors in April. Judge posted a slash line of .571/.640/1.333 with eight runs scored, 12 hits, a double, five home runs, six RBIs and three walks over six games played (five multi-hit games and his 13th career multi-homer game). He also hit his 130th career home run, the second-most in MLB history through 460 career games, trailing only Ryan Howard (142).

On May 23, Judge earned his first career walk-off RBI, taking a walk on a 3–1 pitch against Liam Hendriks of the Chicago White Sox. After being named the starting right fielder in the 2021 MLB All-Star Game, Judge became the sixth Yankees player selected to at least three All-Star teams since 2010, joining Dellin Betances, Robinson Canó, Derek Jeter, Mariano Rivera, and C.C. Sabathia.

On July 9, Judge recorded his 500th career hit during a game against the Houston Astros by hitting a double to left field off pitcher Brandon Bielak. He became the second fastest Yankee to 500 hits and 100 home runs. He accomplished the feat in his 506th game with only Joe DiMaggio getting there faster at 395 games.

In July 2021, before the start of the second half of the season, Judge and five other players tested positive for COVID-19 causing the Yankees to place them all on the COVID-19 injured list. The MLB went on to postpone the Yankees game against the Boston Red Sox that was scheduled to be played on July 15. The postponed game was made up as part of a doubleheader on August 17, at Yankee Stadium.

On August 12, in the Field of Dreams game in Iowa, Judge hit two multiple-run home runs. He also hit two home runs in on the 9/11 Memorial 20th anniversary game on September 11 against the New York Mets with his 31st and 32nd home runs. This ranks him 2nd in MLB history with the fewest games to 150 home runs (552). Only Ryan Howard accomplished the feat in fewer games (495). This was Judge's 15th multi-home run game of his career.

Judge finished the 2021 season batting .287/.373/.544 with 39 home runs and 98 RBIs. His .287 batting average and 158 hits were the highest of his career.

On October 3, the last game of the regular season, Judge hit his first career walk-off hit, a single that scored Tyler Wade to beat the Tampa Bay Rays 1–0 and clinch a wild card spot for the Yankees.

In 2021, Judge had the highest average exit velocity of all major league batters, at 95.8 mph.

On October 28, 2021, Judge was named a Fielding Bible Award winner for his defensive excellence in the right field for the 2021 season. This was his first career Fielding Bible Award. He became the second Yankees outfielder to win a Fielding Bible Award since teammate Brett Gardner. Judge is tied for second place among right fielders in Outfield Arm Runs Saved.

On November 11, 2021, Judge won his second Silver Slugger award. He had a banner season, compiling 39 home runs, 98 RBI's and a .287/.373/.544 slash line over 148 games.

On November 23, 2021, Judge was named to the First Team selections for the All-MLB Team at the outfield position. Determined by a fan vote and a panel consisting of media members, former players and baseball officials, this was Judge's first time being selected after coming off a season in which he led the Yankees in most offensive categories.

2022

Before the 2022 New York Yankees season, Judge was unsuccessful in negotiating a long-term contract with the Yankees. General manager Brian Cashman told ESPN that the team offered Judge $17 million in arbitration and a seven-year extension worth $213.5 million. Cashman refused to comment on whether this affected the negotiations. Judge avoided salary arbitration and signed a one-year, $19 million contract on June 24, with additional $250,000 bonuses for winning each of the MVP Award and the World Series MVP Award.

On July 30, Judge became the second-fastest player in history to hit his 200th career home run (behind Ryan Howard), launching a two-run shot off of Jon Heasley of the Kansas City Royals. On August 29, during a game against the Los Angeles Angels, Judge hit a home run off reliever Ryan Tepera. He became only the tenth player in Major League Baseball history (and third player in Yankees franchise history) to record multiple 50 home run seasons.

Judge hit his 55th home run during the first game of a doubleheader against the Minnesota Twins on September 7 off rookie starting pitcher Louie Varland. He became the fourth player in MLB history to hit 55-plus home runs and steal 15-plus bases in a single season, joining Babe Ruth (1921), Sammy Sosa (1998), and Ken Griffey Jr. (1997–98) on the all-time list. Ninety-five years after Babe Ruth hit 60 home runs in a season, Judge became the third MLB player in American League (AL) history to hit 60 home runs in one season. His blast to left field was off Wil Crowe of the Pittsburgh Pirates at Yankee Stadium on September 20, 2022. He also became the fastest Yankee to accomplish this feat, doing so in 147 games.

On September 28, Judge hit his 61st home run off Tim Mayza of the Toronto Blue Jays, tying Roger Maris for the most home runs in a single season in American League history. Judge hit his 62nd home run off Jesús Tinoco of the Texas Rangers on October 4, setting the new single-season American League home run record. Some consider Judge's mark of 62 home runs to also be the legitimate Major League single-season record, as the only players with more home runs in a single season (Barry Bonds, Sosa, and McGwire) have all been tied to use of performance-enhancing drugs. 

In 2022, Judge led the major leagues with 62 home runs, 133 runs scored, 131 RBIs (tied with Pete Alonso of the Mets), and 111 walks, and batted .311/.425/.686 with 177 hits, 28 doubles, and 19 intentional walks, while stealing 16 bases in 19 attempts. He played 78 games in center field, 73 games in right field, and 25 games as a designated hitter.

For his play in the 2022 regular season, Judge won the 2022 American League MVP Award, earning 28 of 30 first-place votes. Judge's 2022 campaign is considered one of the best offensive seasons in Major League history.

After the 2022 season, Judge became a free agent. The Yankees offered Judge the qualifying offer, which he declined.

2023
During free agency, Judge was pursued by the San Diego Padres and San Francisco Giants. By early December 2022, the latter offered him over $400 million (according to Judge's agent). The Yankees were only offering $320 million over eight years. A new deal with the Yankees was created in a direct phone call between Judge and Hal Steinbrenner, the Yankees' owner, when Steinbrenner offered to add a ninth year and a guaranteed additional $40 million.  That become the foundation of an agreement that the Yankees and Judge signed on December 20, 2022, with the nine-year, $360 million deal breaking the record for the largest free agent deal in MLB history.  In a press conference on the following day, Steinbrenner named Judge the 16th captain of the Yankees, and the first since Derek Jeter had retired eight years earlier.

On December 30, Judge was voted The Associated Press (AP) "Male Athlete of the Year" by a panel of 40 sports writers and editors from news outlets throughout the United States. Judge just edged out Los Angeles Angels two-way star and last year's winner Shohei Ohtani in voting. Judge joined an esteemed fraternity of honorees that includes Muhammad Ali, Wayne Gretzky, Jesse Owens, and Michael Jordan. As well as, former Yankees Joe DiMaggio, Mickey Mantle and Roger Maris.

Records and milestones

New York Yankees franchise records
 Most home runs in a season hit at home: 33 (Babe Ruth held the record with 32).
 Most home runs in a season by a rookie: 52 (Joe DiMaggio held the record with 29)
 Most home runs in a single season: 62 (Roger Maris held the record with 61)
 First right-handed hitter in Yankees history with at least 100 RBIs, 100 runs scored and 100 walks in a single season
 Most home runs (4) in the first seven home playoff games, tying Reggie Jackson (1977–78).
 Tied most home runs by the All-Star break (33; Roger Maris also hit 33 home runs in 1961).
 Fastest to reach 60 home runs in a single season (147th team game).

AL records
 Home runs in a rookie season (52, 2017)
 Strikeouts in a single postseason (27, 2017)
 Strikeouts in a rookie season (208, 2017)
 Home runs in a single season (62, 2022)

MLB records
 Striking out in 37 consecutive games. (2017)
 Most strikeouts by a rookie with 208.
 Most walks by a rookie with 127.
 First rookie in MLB history with at least 45 home runs, 100 RBIs and 100 runs scored.
 Fastest to reach 60 career home runs. (197 games)
 Most strikeouts in a doubleheader with 8.
 Most career home runs in postseason winner takes all games (4)
 Most home runs in a single season in AL history with 62. (2022)

Awards and honors
 50 Home Run Club (2017, 2022)
 60 Home Run Club (2022)
 Home Run Derby Champion (2017)
 Rookie of the Year (2017)
 MLB All-Star (2017, 2018, 2021, 2022)
 Silver Slugger (2017, 2021, 2022)
 Hank Aaron Award (2022)
 Fielding Bible Award (2021)
 All-MLB Team (outfield) (2021)
 American League MVP (2022)
 All-MLB First Team (outfield) (2022)
 The Associated Press (AP) Male Athlete of the Year (2022)

Uniform
Judge has worn the unusual uniform number of 99 since it was given to him during 2016 spring training (higher numbers are typically given to young players who are not expected to make the final regular-season roster). Judge has stated he would prefer either No. 44 (retired by the Yankees to honor Reggie Jackson) or No. 35 but is not sure whether he would switch if the latter two were to become available.

MLB along with the MLB Players Association, created Players Weekend to let players "express themselves while connecting with their past in youth baseball". From August 25–27, 2017, players wore alternate team jerseys inspired by youth league designs. They also had the option to replace their last names with their nicknames on their jersey nameplates, and the vast majority of players did so. Judge chose the nickname "All Rise" (given to him by former teammate Todd Frazier) to be worn on the back of his jersey nameplate. For the 2018 Players Weekend, Judge chose to just have his last name on the back of his jersey. During the 2019 event, Judge chose his own nickname, "BAJ", an abbreviation of "Big Aaron Judge".

Player profile
Due to his large size and strength, he has elicited comparisons to teammate Giancarlo Stanton, Richie Sexson, Dave Winfield, and Willie Stargell.

Pregame rituals
Judge has been credited as a team leader both on and off the field. He has a number of rituals before, during, and after games that set him apart from other players. According to Michael Kay (as discussed during The Michael Kay Show), before each game at Yankee Stadium, Judge ceremoniously tosses exactly 40 sunflower seeds in the grass behind home plate (one for each man on the extended Yankees roster.) The prayer he recites after he tosses the seeds is unknown to the public.

Personal life
Judge is a Christian and has posted about his faith on his Twitter account. He keeps a note on his phone that reads ".179", his batting average with the Yankees in 2016, and looks at it daily as a source of motivation. Judge appeared on the cover of the May 15, 2017, edition of Sports Illustrated. On May 15, 2017, he appeared on an episode of The Tonight Show Starring Jimmy Fallon where he posed undercover to ask Yankee fans questions about himself. On November 6, 2017, it was revealed that Judge would be the cover athlete for MLB The Show 18'', as well as an endorsement deal with Pepsi. For the 2018 season, Judge signed an endorsement deal with Adidas, finishing his contract with Under Armour he had since 2014.

Judge married Samantha Bracksieck in December 2021.

All Rise Foundation
Judge founded the Aaron Judge All Rise Foundation. Their mission statement is to “Inspire children and youth to become responsible citizens and encourage them to reach unlimited possibilities.”

See also

 List of California State University, Fresno people
 List of Major League Baseball annual home run leaders
 List of Major League Baseball annual runs batted in leaders
 List of Major League Baseball annual runs scored leaders
 List of Major League Baseball players with a home run in their first major league at bat
 List of New York Yankees team records
 New York Yankees award winners and league leaders

Notes

References

External links

 

1992 births
Living people
20th-century Christians
21st-century Christians
African-American baseball players
African-American Christians
American adoptees
American League All-Stars
American League home run champions
American League Most Valuable Player Award winners
American League RBI champions
Baseball players from California
Brewster Whitecaps players
Charleston RiverDogs players
Christians from California
Fresno State Bulldogs baseball players
Major League Baseball outfielders
Major League Baseball Rookie of the Year Award winners
New York Yankees players
People from Linden, California
Players of American football from California
Scottsdale Scorpions players
Scranton/Wilkes-Barre RailRiders players
Silver Slugger Award winners
Tampa Yankees players
Trenton Thunder players
21st-century African-American sportspeople
Anchorage Glacier Pilots players